Mikhail Vitalyevich Petrusyov (born 21 November 1994) is a Russian football player.

Club career
He made his debut in the Russian Second Division for FC Dnepr Smolensk on 18 April 2011 in a game against FC Dynamo Kostroma.

He made his Russian Football National League debut for FC Khimki on 11 July 2016 in a game against FC Tosno.

References

1994 births
Sportspeople from Smolensk
Living people
Russian footballers
Russia youth international footballers
FC Khimki players
FC Lokomotiv Moscow players
FC Fakel Voronezh players
FC SKA Rostov-on-Don players
Association football midfielders
Association football forwards